Schouwen-Duiveland is a municipality and an island in the southwestern Netherlands province of Zeeland.

The northside of the island has two fixed connections to Goeree-Overflakkee, the Brouwersdam and the Grevelingen. The southside has two fixed connections to cross the Oosterschelde to North Beveland, the Stormvloed Kering or Oosterscheldedam, part of the Delta Works and the Zeeland Bridge. 
The island is mostly flat and is, besides a small area, below the sea level. On the western tip is a dune whose highest point is about 42 meters above sea level. The island is, in the summer, very popular with (German) tourists. The Renesse area is a popular holiday destination for young people.

The Brouwersdam is a dam, part of the Delta Works, from Schouwen-Duiveland to Goedereede, the west part of the island of Goeree-Overflakkee in South Holland.

History

The island of Schouwen-Duiveland originally consisted of four islands: Schouwen, Duiveland, Dreischor, and Bommenede. Over the centuries it has grown by nature and man together. The dam between Schouwen and Duiveland dates from 1610.

On 30 April 1900 the Rotterdam Tramway Company opened a steam tram line on the island running as public transport until 1 February 1953. After the floods of 1953, the service has not been restored and has been replaced by a bus line.

During the Second World War, Schouwen-Duiveland was the only island that remained under German occupation until May 1945. In December 1944, the Germans had declared their intent to deport all local men aged between 17 and 40. The local resistance fighters made plans to sabotage this by stealing all the registers on the island with the help of nearby Allies, who were preparing to liberate the island. Events unfolded that led to the capture of ten local men who were subsequently executed.

After the completion of the Brouwersdam in 1972 the island became a center of water sports. Surfing, sailing and diving are common activities on the North Sea beaches and the Grevelingenmeer.

Geography

Topography

Dutch Topographic map of the island of Schouwen-Duiveland, as per Sept. 2014.

Demography

The main population centres are listed in the tables below (as of 2021).

There are two places in Schouwen-Duiveland, Zierikzee and Brouwershaven, which in the past had gained city rights. Then there are the hamlets Looperskapelle, Moriaanshoofd, Nieuwerkerk, Nieuwerkerke, Schuddebeurs, Westenschouwen, Zierikzee, Beldert , Brijdorpe , Burghsluis, Capelle , Elkerzee and New Haamstede. The town hall is in Zierikzee.
 
There is no village called Schouwen-Duiveland; the municipality takes its name from the island, which received its name when the former islands Schouwen and Duiveland (and Dreischor) were poldered together.

Nature in Schouwen-Duiveland
A large number of nature reserves can be found on Schouwen-Duiveland. They are usually managed by Staatsbosbeheer. Most nature reserves are accessible to visitors. The areas are particularly suitable for bird watchers and cyclists. In the nature of Schouwen Duiveland, European special species such as avocet, curlew and plover can be found. Boswachterij Westerschouwen is the largest forest in the province of Zeeland. In addition to the nature in and around the Grevelingenmeer, the following nature reserves can be found on Schouwen-Duiveland:

Boswachterij Westerschouwen (Westenshouwen Forest)
Kop van Schouwen
Slikken van Dijkwater
Dorpsbos Sirjansland (Sirjansland Village Forest)
Duinzoom
Gadra
Kakkersweel (Small lake between Kerkwerve & Noordgouwe)

Karolingische Burcht 
Krekengebied Ouwerkerk
Meeuwenduinen
Naterskreek
Plan Tureluur (Redshank reserve)
Prunje
Schelphoek (Wetland on site of former hamlet near Serooskerke)

Schouwse Dijkbeemden
Schuddebeurs (natuurgebied)
De Steenzwaan (The Stone Swan - creek/wetlands near Nieuwerkerk)
Vliegveld (natuurgebied)
Vroongronden
Zoeten en Zouten Haard

Governance

The municipality of Schouwen-Duiveland on 1 January 1997 came about after six municipalities were merged. These municipalities were Brouwershaven , Bruinisse , Duiveland , Middenschouwen , Westerschouwen and Zierikzee . These six municipalities were created on 1 January 1961 from a previous reclassification.

City Council

The council of Schouwen-Duiveland consists of 23 seats. Below is the composition of the council since 1997:

On 13 November 1996 ¹ reclassification elections were held. The first council was launched on 1 January 1997.
Explanations for the bracketed number of councillors for some parties between the 2018 and 2022 elections are below:
A councilor of the VVD left the party in 2018 and joined Leefbaar Schouwen-Duiveland in 2019.
A councilor of the ChristenUnie left the party in 2019 and joined the CDA
A councilor of GroenLinks left the party in 2018 and continued under the name "Lijst Jet van Gent"
"List Jet van Gent/ Hart voor Schouwen-Duiveland" merged with Leefbaar Schouwen-Duiveland in 2021"

Mayor & Aldermen
Mayor Jack van der Hoek (None)
Councillor Jacqueline Burg ( Liveable Schouwen-Duiveland )
Alderman Daniël Joppe ( CDA )
Alderman Paula Schot ( SGP )
Alderman Ankie Smit ( GroenLinks )
Secretary Marieke van den Heuvel

Culture

There are a number of national monuments in the municipality, including the war memorial at Oude Moolweg in Renesse and the Jewish Memorial on Caustraat in Zierikzee. The war memorial commemorates in particular the ten local resistance fighters executed by the Germans on 10 December 1944. It also commemorates all local citizens who died during the Second World War or the 'police actions' in the Dutch East Indies.

The Westenschouwen mermaid was the main character in a saga that is localized in Zeeland relating to the destruction of the village Westenschouwen on the island of Schouwen-Duiveland. The mermaid saga explains the decline of this once prosperous village. The saga predicts the demise of the village, with only the tower remaining. After the tower was demolished in 1845, the Plompe Tower was seen as the remaining tower of Westenschouwen. Plompe Tower is open to tourists and when you open the door of the tower the story of the mermaid will be played automatically and displayed via a carousel stories. The mermaid is celebrated in the local coat of arms.

Notable residents

Public thinking & Public Service 
 John III, Lord of Renesse (1249–1304) Zeeland nobleman and warrior 
 Cornelius van Zierikzee (ca.1405 n Zierikzee – 1462) a Dutch priest, worked in Scotland  
 Petrus Peckius the Elder (1529 in Zierikzee – 1589) jurist, wrote about maritime law
 Bonifacius de Jonge (1567 in Zierikzee – 1625) was Grand pensionary of Zeeland 1615-1625 
 Joost Berman (1793 in Ouwerkerk – 1855) lawyer, judge, politician, poet, writer and editor
 Alexander Johan Berman (1828 in Zierikzee – 1886) the Dutch Reformed minister of Watergang
 Anton Constandse (1899 in Brouwershaven – 1983) a Dutch anarchist, author and journalist
 George van Heukelom (born 1949) a Dutch former politician 
 Leen van Dijke (born 1955 in Oosterland) a retired Dutch politician
 Hugo de Jonge (born 1977 in Bruinisse) a Dutch politician & Deputy Prime Minister
 Rutger Bregman (born 1988 in Westerschouwen) a Dutch popular historian and author

The Arts 
 Jacob Cats (1577 in Brouwershaven – 1660) a Dutch poet, humorist, jurist and politician, famous for his emblem books
 Charles Hofmann (1763 – 1823 in Zierikzee) a Dutch musician and composer
 Henry Van der Weyde (1838 in Zierikzee – 1924) Dutch-born English painter and photographer
 Leonard Ochtman (1854 in Zonnemaire – 1935) a Dutch-American Impressionist painter 
 Digna Sinke (born 1949 in Zonnemaire) a Dutch film director, producer and screenwriter 
 Jan van den Bosch (born 1950) TV presenter on RTL5 
 Ester Naomi Perquin (born 1980) a Dutch poet, brought up in Zierikzee

Science & Business 

 Jacob Bellaert (born in Zierikzee) an early publisher of 17 books in Haarlem from 1483-1486
 Levinus Lemnius (1505 in Zierikzee – 1568 in Zierikzee) a Dutch physician and author
 Johannes Cornelis de Jonge (1793 in Zierikzee – 1853) Chief Archivist of the Dutch National Archives
 Johannes van de Velde Olivier (1795 in Serooskerke – 1845) a publisher, printer, bookbinder and bookseller
 Pieter de Looze (1811–1881) newspaper publisher, founded the Zierikzeesche Nieuwsbode
 Pieter Zeeman (1865 in Zonnemaire – 1943) a Dutch physicist who shared the 1902 Nobel Prize in Physics for their discovery of the Zeeman effect

Sport 
 Adrie Koster (born 1954 in Zierikzee) a Dutch football manager
 Nelli Cooman (born 1964) 60 metres two-time World indoor champion, six-time European indoor champion and former world record holder. Lives in Nieuwerkerk

Gallery

References

External links 

  (in Dutch)

 
Municipalities of Zeeland
Islands of Zeeland
Regions of Zeeland
Regions of the Netherlands
Municipalities of the Netherlands established in 1997
Rhine–Meuse–Scheldt delta
Islands of the Rhine–Meuse–Scheldt delta